The Girramay  are an Australian Aboriginal tribe of northern Queensland.

Name
The Girramay ethnonym is formed from jir:a, meaning "man".

Language
The Girramay spoke the most southerly dialect of Dyirbal.

Country
Northwards, their boundaries reach close to the upper Murray River and the Cardwell Range, and also take in inland areas of the Herbert River.

Society
Before European settlement, the Girramay lived in a mixture of rainforest and open forest environments.

Foods and artefacts
Girramay territory has trees with a variety of bark that could be beaten into a cloth to fashion a "rain shield" and neighbouring tribes such as the Dyirbal and Ngajanji therefore called this device a keramai, their pronunciation of the Girramay ethnonym.
 wila (cakes of brown walnut)

Alternative names
 Kiramai
 Giramai, Giramay, Giramaygan
 Kirrama, Kirrami, Kerrami
 Wombelbara (Warakamai exonym)

Some words
 gamu (water) cf. Dyirbal bana
 gumbul (woman) cf. Dyirbal jugumbil
 garba (ear) cf. Dyirbal manga
 wuyan, a verb meaning to "keep on taking bit by bit from a group, or from a pile of objects, until scarcely any remain"
 whoyerr (tame dog)

Notes

Citations

Sources

External links 

 Girramay Language Recordings and Language Recording Workshop, State Library of Queensland

Aboriginal peoples of Queensland
Far North Queensland